Ashton West is a tram stop on the East Manchester Line (EML) of Greater Manchester's light-rail Metrolink system. It was built as part of Phase 3b of the Metrolink's expansion, and is located on Lord Sheldon Way near the Ashton Moss leisure complex, in western Ashton-under-Lyne, Tameside, England. The stop opened on 9 October 2013, ahead of the originally-publicised schedule of the winter of 2013–14. The stop primarily serves the aforementioned leisure and retail complex, and is also the closest to the Tameside Stadium, home of Curzon Ashton F.C.

The stop is one of the least used on the Metrolink network.

Services

Services are every 6 minutes at peak times and every 12 minutes offpeak.

Gallery

References

External links

 https://web.archive.org/web/20090411103135/http://www.lrta.org/Manchester/phase3b.html
Metrolink stop information
Ashton West area map

Tram stops in Tameside
Tram stops on the Bury to Ashton-under-Lyne line